Hasanabad (also Romanized as Ḩasanābād; also known as Ḩasanābād-e Sang Makī) is a village in Arzuiyeh Rural District, in the Central District of Arzuiyeh County, Kerman Province, Iran. At the 2006 census, its population was 31, in 5 families.

References 

Populated places in Arzuiyeh County